Shut the fuck up is an expletive form of "shut up".

Shut the fuck up may also refer to:

 "Shut the Fuck Up", a song by Basshunter
 Shut the Fuck Up Tour, also known as the Ghost of Tom Joad Tour, featuring Bruce Springsteen

See also
 Shut up (disambiguation)
 STFU (disambiguation)